C. aromatica may refer to:
 Campomanesia aromatica, a plant species endemic to Brazil
 Cochleanthes aromatica, an orchid species
 Curcuma aromatica, the wild turmeric, a plant species found in South Asia

See also 
 Aromatica